In mathematics, convex geometry is the branch of geometry studying convex sets, mainly in Euclidean space. Convex sets occur naturally in many areas: computational geometry, convex analysis, discrete geometry, functional analysis, geometry of numbers, integral geometry, linear programming, probability theory, game theory, etc.

Classification
According to the Mathematics Subject Classification MSC2010, the mathematical discipline Convex and Discrete Geometry includes three major branches:
 general convexity
 polytopes and polyhedra
 discrete geometry
(though only portions of the latter two are included in convex geometry).

General convexity is further subdivided as follows:  
axiomatic and generalized convexity			
convex sets without dimension restrictions 			
convex sets in topological vector spaces  			
convex sets in 2 dimensions (including convex curves) 		
convex sets in 3 dimensions (including convex surfaces) 	
convex sets in n dimensions (including convex hypersurfaces) 		
finite-dimensional Banach spaces				
random convex sets and integral geometry 
asymptotic theory of convex bodies 
approximation by convex sets 					
variants of convex sets (star-shaped, (m, n)-convex, etc.) 		
Helly-type theorems and geometric transversal theory		
other problems of combinatorial convexity  			
length, area, volume 						
mixed volumes and related topics 
valuations on convex bodies			
inequalities and extremum problems  		
convex functions and convex programs 
spherical and hyperbolic convexity  		

The term convex geometry is also used in combinatorics as an alternate name for an antimatroid, which is one of the abstract models of convex sets.

Historical note
Convex geometry is a relatively young mathematical discipline. Although the first known contributions to convex geometry date back to antiquity and can be traced in the works of Euclid and Archimedes, it became an  independent branch of mathematics at the turn of the 20th century, mainly due to the works of Hermann Brunn and Hermann Minkowski in dimensions two and three. A big part of their results was soon generalized to spaces of higher dimensions, and in 1934 T. Bonnesen and W. Fenchel gave a comprehensive survey of convex geometry in Euclidean space Rn. Further development of convex geometry in the 20th century and its relations to numerous mathematical disciplines are summarized in the Handbook of convex geometry edited by P. M. Gruber and J. M. Wills.

See also
 List of convexity topics

Notes

References
Expository articles on convex geometry 
K. Ball, An elementary introduction to modern convex geometry, in: Flavors of Geometry, pp. 1–58, Math. Sci. Res. Inst. Publ. Vol. 31, Cambridge Univ. Press, Cambridge, 1997, available online.
M. Berger, Convexity, Amer. Math. Monthly, Vol. 97 (1990), 650–678. DOI: 10.2307/2324573
P. M. Gruber, Aspects of convexity and its applications, Exposition. Math., Vol. 2 (1984), 47–83. 
V. Klee, What is a convex set? Amer. Math. Monthly, Vol. 78 (1971), 616–631, DOI: 10.2307/2316569

Books on convex geometry  
T. Bonnesen, W. Fenchel, Theorie der konvexen Körper, Julius Springer, Berlin, 1934. English translation: Theory of convex bodies, BCS Associates, Moscow, ID, 1987. 
R. J. Gardner, Geometric tomography, Cambridge University Press, New York, 1995. Second edition: 2006.
P. M. Gruber, Convex and discrete geometry, Springer-Verlag, New York, 2007. 
P. M. Gruber, J. M. Wills (editors), Handbook of convex geometry. Vol. A. B, North-Holland, Amsterdam, 1993.
G. Pisier, The volume of convex bodies and Banach space geometry, Cambridge University Press, Cambridge, 1989.  
R. Schneider, Convex bodies: the Brunn-Minkowski theory, Cambridge University Press, Cambridge, 1993; Second edition: 2014.  
A. C. Thompson, Minkowski geometry, Cambridge University Press, Cambridge, 1996.

Articles on history of convex geometry  
W. Fenchel, Convexity through the ages, (Danish) Danish Mathematical Society (1929—1973), pp. 103–116, Dansk. Mat. Forening, Copenhagen, 1973. English translation: Convexity through the ages, in: P. M. Gruber, J. M. Wills (editors),  Convexity and its Applications, pp. 120–130, Birkhauser Verlag, Basel, 1983. 
P. M. Gruber, Zur Geschichte der Konvexgeometrie und der Geometrie der Zahlen, in: G. Fischer, et al. (editors), Ein Jahrhundert Mathematik 1890–1990, pp. 421–455, Dokumente Gesch. Math., Vol. 6, F. Wieweg and Sohn, Braunschweig; Deutsche Mathematiker Vereinigung, Freiburg, 1990. 
P. M. Gruber, History of convexity, in: P. M. Gruber, J. M. Wills (editors), Handbook of convex geometry. Vol. A, pp. 1–15, North-Holland, Amsterdam, 1993.

External links